Peter J. Atkins is emeritus professor of geography at Durham University. He is a specialist in food history and the geography of food.

Selected publications
 Atkins, P.J. A History of Uncertainty: Bovine Tuberculosis in Britain, 1850 to the Present. Winchester: Winchester University Press; 2016. 
 Atkins, P.J. (Ed.) Animal Cities: Beastly Urban Histories Farnham: Ashgate; 2012.
 Atkins, P.J. Liquid materialities: a history of milk, science and the law. Farnham: Ashgate; 2010.
 Atkins, P.J. & Bowler, I.R. Food in Society, economy, culture, geography. London New York: Arnold; 2001.
 Atkins, P.J., Simmons, I.G. & Roberts, B.K. People, Land and Time. Arnold; 1998.
 Raw, M. & Atkins, P.J. Agriculture and Food. Collins Educational; 1995.
 Atkins, P.J. The Directories of London, 1677-1977. Mansell; 1990.

References 

Living people
Academics of Durham University
Alumni of the University of Cambridge
People educated at Merchant Taylors' Boys' School, Crosby
Historians of agriculture
English geographers
Year of birth missing (living people)